Zeus Rafael Mendoza Flores (born 23 October 1982) is a Mexican politician from the Party of the Democratic Revolution. In 2012 he served as Deputy of the LXI Legislature of the Mexican Congress representing Morelos.

References

1982 births
Living people
Politicians from Morelos
Party of the Democratic Revolution politicians
21st-century Mexican politicians
Deputies of the LXI Legislature of Mexico
Members of the Chamber of Deputies (Mexico) for Morelos